OPS-SAT is a CubeSat by the European Space Agency (ESA) and it is intended to demonstrate the improvements in mission control capabilities that will arise when satellites can fly more powerful on-board computers. The mission has the objective to break the cycle of "has never flown, will never fly" in the area of satellite control. It was the first CubeSat operated directly by ESA.

The satellite has an experimental computer that is ten times more powerful than traditional ESA on-board computers. This on-board computer provides an experimental platform to run software experiments on board. One innovative concept is the deployment of space software in the form of apps. This concept is enabled by the NanoSat MO Framework (NMF) and allows Apps to be uploaded to the spacecraft and then started on board. This is a new concept that ESA has successfully demonstrated in space.

OPS-SAT has been launched at 08:54:20 UTC on 18 December 2019 exactly twenty-four hours later than originally planned.

Payload and communications 
OPS-SAT will provide an in-orbit test-bed environment for the deployment of different experiments to test new protocols, new algorithms, and new techniques. The satellite is being designed to be robust and no single point of failure should exist, therefore it shall be always possible to recover the spacecraft if something goes wrong with one of the software experiments. The robustness of the basic satellite itself will allow ESA flight control teams to upload and try out new, innovative control software submitted by experimenters.

OPS-SAT payload devices:
 Experimental Platform: Critical Link MityARM 5CSX
 Fine ADCS
 GPS
 Camera
 Software-defined radio
 Optical Receiver

Communication links to ground:
 S band: CCSDS-compatible S-band communication: Syrlinks - EWC31
 X band: CNES funded X-band transmitter (payload of opportunity)
 UHF: Backup communications link

Experimental Platform 
The Experimental Platform of OPS-SAT is where experiments will be running. It has two Critical Link MityARM 5CSX in cold redundancy (if one fails, the second one is used). These have a Dual-core 800 MHz ARM Cortex-A9 processor, an Altera Cyclone V FPGA, 1 GB DDR3 RAM, and an external mass memory device with 8 GB.
 Linux
 Java
 CCSDS File Delivery Protocol (CFDP)
 NanoSat MO Framework

ESA's aim is to remove as many barriers to experimentation as possible. For example, there will be no paperwork, ESOC's infrastructure will be ready to do automated tests on the experiments, and aims at reducing the overheads close to zero. Additionally, the experiments can be easily developed in form of apps using the NanoSat MO Framework.

NanoSat MO Framework (NMF) 
The most innovative concept in OPS-SAT is the deployment of space software in the form of apps.

The NanoSat MO Framework (NMF) is a software framework for nanosatellites based on CCSDS Mission Operations services. It includes a Software Development Kit (SDK) to develop experiments as NMF Apps which can then be installed, started, and stopped in space. The framework also includes monitoring and control capabilities for the apps which will allow experimenters from the ground to take control of their software when it is running in space.

The OPS-SAT system image comes with the NanoSat MO Framework which interfaces with all of the OPS-SAT payload systems and provides it in the form of services to the experimenter application. The NanoSat MO Framework allows simple integration of other libraries and applications. During the development of the experiments, the NMF SDK can be used and it includes a simulator, providing most of the platform functionalities accessible to the experimenter. The simulator allows developers to make their NMF Apps without the need to access an advanced satellite testbed hardware platform.

On the ground, EUD4MO will provide a web-based solution for the monitoring and control of NMF Apps. OPS-SAT experimenters will be able to take control using their web browser.

See also 
 List of CubeSats

References

External links
 OPS-SAT Evolving Software Technology for Spacecraft Operations
 OPS-SAT article on eoPortal by ESA

Spacecraft launched in 2019
CubeSats
European Space Agency satellites
Technology demonstrations